Juan Manuel Peña Montaño (born 17 January 1973) is a Bolivian retired footballer who played as a central defender.

The vast majority of his professional career was spent in Spain, where he played a total of 14 years for three teams (mainly Valladolid), appearing in a total of 305 La Liga games.

Peña played more than 80 times with Bolivia, representing the nation at the 1994 World Cup and five Copa América tournaments.

Club career
Born in Santa Cruz de la Sierra, Peña played for Club Blooming in his home country and Independiente Santa Fe in Colombia, before moving to Spain in 1995. At Real Valladolid he was a defensive stalwart for nine seasons – sharing teams with compatriot Marco Sandy in his first – leaving for Villarreal CF upon his first team's 2004 relegation from La Liga.

At Villarreal Peña figured less prominently, but managed to score a rare goal, in a 3–0 home win against Málaga CF on 19 December 2004. After just six league appearances during 2006–07 he switched to Celta de Vigo, in the second division.

Following two seasons of intermittent use, Peña retired in mid-November 2009 aged 36, not wishing to pursue his career anymore after careful deliberation. However, on 25 March of the following year, he signed with D.C. United of the Major League Soccer.

International career
After his debut for Bolivia in 1991 (aged 18), Peña went on to become one of its most capped players and team captain. With 85 international matches, he played a FIFA World Cup game, against Spain in 1994 (1–3 group stage loss), and also appeared in five Copa América editions.

Peña scored only once for the national team, in a friendly match with Honduras played in Washington on 11 October 2003. In his penultimate appearance, on 1 April 2009, he helped to the 6–1 demolition of Argentina in La Paz for the 2010 World Cup qualifiers.

International goals

Honours

Club
Villarreal
UEFA Intertoto Cup: 2004

References

External links
Stats at Liga de Fútbol Profesional 

MLS player profile

1973 births
Living people
Sportspeople from Santa Cruz de la Sierra
Bolivian people of Spanish descent
Bolivian footballers
Association football central defenders
Bolivian Primera División players
Categoría Primera A players
Club Blooming players
Independiente Santa Fe footballers
La Liga players
Segunda División players
Real Valladolid players
Villarreal CF players
RC Celta de Vigo players
Major League Soccer players
D.C. United players
Bolivia international footballers
1994 FIFA World Cup players
1993 Copa América players
1995 Copa América players
1991 Copa América players
1999 Copa América players
2007 Copa América players
1999 FIFA Confederations Cup players
Bolivian expatriate footballers
Expatriate footballers in Colombia
Expatriate footballers in Spain
Expatriate soccer players in the United States
Bolivian expatriate sportspeople in Colombia
Bolivian expatriate sportspeople in Spain
Bolivian expatriate sportspeople in the United States